László Foltán Sr. (born May 25, 1953) is a Hungarian sprint canoeist who competed in the late 1970s and early 1980s. He won the C-2 500 m event at the 1980 Summer Olympics in Moscow.

Foltán also won four medals in the C-2 500 m event at the ICF Canoe Sprint World Championships with three golds (1977, 1978, 1981) and one bronze (1982).

References

Sports-reference.com profile

1953 births
Canoeists at the 1980 Summer Olympics
Hungarian male canoeists
Living people
Olympic canoeists of Hungary
Olympic gold medalists for Hungary
Olympic medalists in canoeing
ICF Canoe Sprint World Championships medalists in Canadian
Medalists at the 1980 Summer Olympics